Government Sponsored Multipurpose School (GSMS) for Boys, Taki House is a school in Kolkata, West Bengal, India. Its main campus is located in 299B Acharya Prafulla Chandra (APC) Road, Kolkata, started in the year 1965.

About School
The school has grades 1 to 12 and the language of instruction in the main campus is Bengali. However it has also recently opened an English Medium campus. Students take the 10+ (Madhyamik) examination under the West Bengal Board of Secondary Education and 12+ (Higher Secondary Examination) under the West Bengal Council of Higher Secondary Education.

See also
Education in India
List of schools in India
Education in West Bengal

References

External links 
 
 Bengali Documentary on Taki House Boys' School on youtube

Boys' schools in India
Schools in Colonial India
High schools and secondary schools in West Bengal
1965 establishments in West Bengal
High schools and secondary schools in Kolkata